Mark Lee Colbourne MBE (born 9 November 1969) is a former Welsh paralympic-cyclist, who competed for both Wales and Great Britain.

Early life
Colbourne was born on 9 November 1969 in Tredegar, Monmouthshire, Wales. He played volleyball at international level for Wales between 1990 and 1993.

He broke his back in 2009 after falling  when forced into an emergency landing whilst paragliding.

Cycling career
Following his accident Colbourne began cycling through Disability Sport Wales. He competes in the C1 classification for riders on upright bikes with the most severe disability. He trained with disabled cycling coach Neil Smith at the Newport Velodrome and made his first appearance in a track race in May 2010 at the Wales Grand Prix.

In 2011 he won his first UCI Para-Cycling World Cup medals. He took bronze in the C1 time trail in Segovia, Spain at his debut at World Cup level. At the round in Baie-Comeau, Canada, he won the silver medal in the same event behind Juan Jose Mendez Fernandez of Spain. His first World Championship medal was a silver at the 2011 UCI Para-Cycling Road World Championships held in Roskilde, Denmark.

In 2012 Colbourne won his first world title, taking the gold medal in the C1 3 km individual pursuit at the 2012 UCI Para-Cycling Track World Championships in Los Angeles, United States. At the same Championships he won the silver medal in the C1 1 km time trial.

He was selected as part of the cycling team for Great Britain at the 2012 Summer Paralympics. On 30 August 2012 Colbourne won a silver medal and Great Britain's first medal of the 2012 Paralympics, in the C1-3 1 km time trial.
On 31 August 2012 he won a gold medal in the C1 3 km individual pursuit after breaking the world record in both the qualification round and the final. He is scheduled to compete in two road cycling events; the C1 road time trial, on 5 September; and the C1-3 road race on 6 September.

Colbourne was appointed Member of the Order of the British Empire (MBE) in the 2013 New Year Honours for services to cycling. In August 2013 Colbourne announced his retirement from para-cycling.

See also
 2012 Olympics gold post boxes in the United Kingdom

References 

1969 births
Living people
Sportspeople from Tredegar
Welsh men's volleyball players
Welsh male cyclists
Paralympic cyclists of Great Britain
Cyclists at the 2012 Summer Paralympics
Paralympic silver medalists for Great Britain
Paralympic gold medalists for Great Britain
Welsh people with disabilities
Members of the Order of the British Empire
UCI Para-cycling World Champions
Medalists at the 2012 Summer Paralympics
Welsh Paralympic competitors
Paralympic medalists in cycling